Pozdnyakovo is a rural locality (a village) in Razdolyevskoye Rural Settlement, Kolchuginsky District, Vladimir Oblast, Russia. The population was 6 as of 2010. There are 3 streets.

Geography 
Slugino is the nearest rural locality.

References 

Rural localities in Kolchuginsky District